Luigi Piccioli (1812–1862) was an Italian musician, singer, voice instructor, and professor of St. Petersburg conservatory.

He was teacher of a composer Peter Tchaikovsky, and many others including Bogomir Korsov (baritone).

1812 births
1862 deaths
19th-century Italian male singers
Italian emigrants to Russia